Browndale may refer to any of the following communities:

Canada
 Brownsdale, Newfoundland and Labrador, a small fishing village on the Trinity Bay side of the northern tip of the Bay de Verde Peninsula, Newfoundland and Labrador, Canada

United States
 Brownsdale, Florida an unincorporated community in Santa Rosa County, Florida
 Brownsdale, Minnesota, a city in Mower County, Minnesota
 Brownsdale, an unincorporated community in Allegheny County, Pennsylvania     
 Brownsdale, an unincorporated community in Butler County, Pennsylvania
 Brownsdale, an unincorporated community in Wayne County, Pennsylvania